Jussi Pesonen (born November 24, 1960, in Helsinki) is the president and chief executive officer of the Finnish pulp, paper and timber company UPM since 2004.

General

Pesonen (born 1960) is the president and chief executive officer of UPM-Kymmene – one of the world's largest leading forest industry companies.

Under Pesonen's leadership, the company has taken strong and decisive measures to reposition itself for the challenges of the new business environment facing forest product companies. This has meant launching major programs for achieving higher levels of efficiency and productivity, expanding UPM's operations outside its traditional European home market, and strengthening its position in self-adhesive labels, pulp, energy related businesses. 

In addition, UPM has developed new businesses and products based on renewable materials including wood-based renewable diesel and biochemicals as well as wood-based biomedical products. He is now leading the company's transformation towards the future beyond fossils.

In recognition of the company strategy, UPM has been selected as UN Global Compact LEAD participant and received several top recognitions for its sustainability performance including Global Compact LEAD participant, Dow Jones Sustainability Index, MSCI's and CDP's Leadership ratings.

Curriculum vitae

Pesonen has been president and CEO of UPM since 2004. Prior to his appointment he also served as COO of UPM Paper Divisions and deputy to the president and CEO from 2001 to 2004. He held several senior management positions in UPM Paper Divisions including vice president of the Newsprint Product Group 1987–2001.  Pesonen joined UPM in 1987 as a production engineer and worked in Jämsänkoski, Kajaani, Kaukas and Shotton mills. Pesonen has a Master of Science degree in engineering in process technology from the University of Oulu, Finland.

Positions of responsibility

Pesonen is the deputy chair and working committee member of the Finnish Forest Industries Federation (FFIF). He also serves as a board member of the Confederation of European Paper Industries (CEPI) and East Office of Finnish Industries Oy. Additionally, Pesonen is a member of the China-Finland Committee for Innovative Business Cooperation and co-chair of its Forestry Working Group.

Earlier, Pesonen chaired the board of Ilmarinen Mutual Pension Insurance Company in 2012–2015, the board of the Finland Chamber of Commerce and ICC Finland in 2017–2021 and co-chaired the Forest Solutions Group (FSG) in World Business Council for Sustainable Development (WBCSD) in 2014–2015. He was also a member of the company's board of directors from March 2007 until the end of March 2020.  He has also been a board member of Outokumpu Ltd 2009–2012,

Pesonen has served as the chairman of the board of the Finland Chamber of Commerce since 2017. He has been a member of the ICC (International Chamber of Commerce) Finland Business Council in 2005 and 2013-, a member of the board 2006-2012 and 2017- and the chairman of the board of directors of ICC Finland since 2017.

References

1960 births
Living people
Businesspeople from Helsinki
University of Oulu alumni